Jay & the Techniques was an American pop group formed in Allentown, Pennsylvania during the mid-1960s. Their song "Apples, Peaches, Pumpkin Pie", released in 1967 on the Smash label, reached the Top 10 on the Billboard Hot 100 chart.

Career
The band was best known for their debut single, "Apples, Peaches, Pumpkin Pie", which was released in 1967 and reached No. 6 in the Billboard Hot 100 chart. The track was arranged by Joe Renzetti, and written by Maurice Irby, Jr. It sold over one million copies, and was awarded a gold disc. Although this song served as the band's primary hit, the group also captured various chart positions with "Keep the Ball Rollin'" (No. 14) and "Strawberry Shortcake". "Keep the Ball Rollin'" also notched up sales in excess of a million copies, to secure a second gold disc for this group. However, its position on the 1960s pop charts declined after "Baby Make Your Own Sweet Music" was released. They made their final effort with the R&B hit, "Number Onderful", but after that, the group disbanded.

"Apples, Peaches, Pumpkin Pie" and "Baby Make Your Own Sweet Music" (the latter a cover of a single first released in 1967 by Johnny Johnson and the Bandwagon) were both released in the UK by Mercury Records and, whilst neither song charted in the UK, in the early 1970s both songs became dance favourites of the British Northern soul music scene.

In 1996, Mercury Records released a compilation album of the band's hits entitled The Best of Jay & The Techniques.

Original band members
Jay Proctor: Lead vocalist and primary founder of the group
George "Lucky" Lloyd: Second vocalist  
Dante Dancho: Lead guitar
Chuck Crowl: Bass guitar  
Karl Landis (Lippowitsch): Drums (was replaced by Paul Coles, Jr.)
Ronnie Goosley: Saxophone  
Jon Walsh: Trumpet (was replaced by Danny Altieri)

Nick Ashford, Valerie Simpson and Melba Moore often served as backing vocalists.

The band was multiracial, Proctor and George (Lucky) Lloyd being the only African-Americans in the group.

Discography

Albums

Singles

See also
List of Mercury Records artists

References

External links
 Jay Proctor interview

American pop music groups
Musical groups from Pennsylvania
Mercury Records artists
Smash Records artists